The list of ship commissionings in 1939 includes a chronological list of ships commissioned in 1939.  In cases where no official commissioning ceremony was held, the date of service entry may be used instead.


References

See also 

1939
 Ship commissionings
 Ship launches
Ship launches